Simon Kühne (born 30 April 1994) is a Liechtensteiner international footballer who plays for SK Meiningen, as a winger.

Career
Born in Austria, Kühne has also played for Austria Lustenau, USV Eschen/Mauren and FC St. Gallen.

He made his senior international debut for Liechtenstein in 2014, having previously played for the under-21 team, where he is currently the nation's all-time top goalscorer with three.

References

1994 births
Living people
Liechtenstein footballers
Liechtenstein international footballers
Austrian footballers
Austrian people of Liechtenstein descent
People with acquired Liechtenstein citizenship
SC Austria Lustenau players
FC St. Gallen players
Association football wingers